Ambodimerana is a rural commune in Anosibe An'ala District, in Alaotra-Mangoro Region, Madagascar. It has a population of 5,630  in 2018.

References

Populated places in Alaotra-Mangoro